This was the second edition of the tournament in the 2021 tennis season. Enzo Couacaud was the defending champion but lost in the second round to Alex Molčan.

Carlos Gimeno Valero won the title after defeating Kimmer Coppejans 6–4, 6–2 in the final.

Seeds

Draw

Finals

Top half

Bottom half

References

External links
Main draw
Qualifying draw

Gran Canaria Challenger II - 1